Calcium hexamine thiocyanate is a pharmaceutical drug that has been used in nasal preparations. It contains hexamine (hexamethylenetetramine) and thiocyanate. This combination has also been used for the treatment of urinary tract infections.

References 

Decongestants